Acanthaecites is an extinct cephalopod genus belonging to the ammonoid family Oppeliidae first described by Rollier in 1909. Acanthaecites both appears and disappears from the fossil record during the Callovian stage of the Jurassic Period.

The shell of Acanthaecites is small, globose and smooth except for a median ventral row of distinct sharp serrations.

References
Notes

Bibliography
 W.J. Arkell, et al. 1957. Mesozoic Ammonoidea. Treatise on Invertebrate Paleontology, Part L, Ammonoidea. University of Kansas Press.

Ammonitida genera
Middle Jurassic ammonites